The Bolognesi Province is one of 20 provinces of the Ancash Region of Peru.

Overview
The province originally was part of Cajatambo Province (part of Lima Region since 1916) until 1903, when it was split off and named after Col. Francisco Bolognesi, the hero of the Battle of Arica. In 1990, Ocros Province split off from Bolognesi.

Geography 
The area of the province comprises parts of four Andean mountain ranges with snow-covered mountains: the Cordillera Blanca, the Cordillera Negra, the Wallanka mountain range and the Waywash mountain range. Some of the highest peaks of the province are listed below:

Political division

Bolognesi is divided into fifteen districts, which are:
 Abelardo Pardo Lezameta 
 Antonio Raymondi 
 Aquia 
 Cajacay 
 Canis 
 Chiquián 
 Colquioc 
 Huallanca 
 Huasta 
 Huayllacayán 
 La Primavera 
 Mangas 
 Pacllón 
 San Miguel de Corpanqui 
 Ticllos

Ethnic groups 
The province is inhabited by indigenous citizens of Quechua descent. Spanish is the language which the majority of the population (84.05%) learnt to speak in childhood, 15.43% of the residents started speaking using the Quechua language (2007 Peru Census).

See also 
 Intipa Ñawin
 Ninaqucha
 Pampaqucha
 Suyruqucha
 Yanaqucha

Sources 

Provinces of the Ancash Region